Qeshlaq Amir Khanlu-ye Moharramabad (also Romanized as Qeshlāq Amīr Khānlū-ye Moḩarramābād; also known as Qeshlāq-e Amīr Khānī) is a village in Mahmudabad Rural District, Tazeh Kand District, Parsabad County, Ardabil Province, Iran. At the 2006 census, its population was 46, in 9 families.

References 

Towns and villages in Parsabad County